Events in the year 1980 in Brazil.

Incumbents

Federal government
 President: General João Figueiredo
 Vice President: Aureliano Chaves

Governors
 Acre: vacant
 Alagoas: Guilherme Palmeira 
 Amazonas: José Bernardino Lindoso 
 Bahia: Antônio Carlos Magalhães 
 Ceará: Virgílio Távora 
 Espírito Santo: Eurico Vieira Resende 
 Goiás: Ary Valadão 
 Maranhão: João Castelo  
 Mato Grosso: Frederico Campos 
 Mato Grosso do Sul: Marcelo Miranda Soares (until 29 October); Pedro Pedrossian (from 29 October)
 Minas Gerais: Francelino Pereira 
 Pará: Alacid Nunes 
 Paraíba: Tarcísio Burity  
 Paraná: Nei Braga 
 Pernambuco: Marco Maciel 
 Piauí: Lucídio Portela 
 Rio de Janeiro: Antônio Chagas Freitas
 Rio Grande do Norte: Lavoisier Maia 
 Rio Grande do Sul: José Augusto Amaral de Souza 
 Santa Catarina: Jorge Bornhausen	 
 São Paulo: Paulo Maluf 
 Sergipe: Augusto Franco

Vice governors
 Acre: José Fernandes Rego
 Alagoas: Teobaldo Vasconcelos Barbosa 
 Amazonas: Paulo Pinto Nery 
 Bahia: Luis Viana Neto 
 Ceará: Manuel de Castro Filho 
 Espírito Santo: José Carlos Fonseca 
 Goiás: Rui Brasil Cavalcanti 
 Maranhão: Artur Teixeira de Carvalho 
 Mato Grosso: José Vilanova Torres 
 Mato Grosso do Sul: vacant
 Minas Gerais: João Marques de Vasconcelos 
 Pará: Gerson dos Santos Peres 
 Paraíba: Clóvis Cavalcanti 
 Paraná: José Hosken de Novaes 
 Pernambuco: Roberto Magalhães Melo 
 Piauí: Waldemar de Castro Macedo
 Rio de Janeiro: Hamilton Xavier
 Rio Grande do Norte: Geraldo Melo 
 Rio Grande do Sul: Otávio Badui Germano 
 Santa Catarina: Henrique Hélion Velho de Córdova 
 São Paulo: José Maria Marin 
 Sergipe: Djenal Tavares Queiroz

Events 
June 1 – Mauro Milhomem, a Brazilian pilot, attempted to crash his Sertanejo-721 into the Hotel Presidente, owned by his mother-in-law, after he had an argument with his wife the previous day due to her cheating on him. The plane failed to hit the target and hit instead into several other objects, ultimately crashing into an accounting office in front of a forum. Six people were killed and four were wounded.

Births
February 25 – Fernando Santos, footballer
April 5
 Carolina Moraes, synchronized swimmer
 Isabela Moraes, synchronized swimmer
May 20 – Cauã Reymond, actor
July 20 – Dado Dolabella, actor
August 16 – Raniere Silva dos Santos, footballer
October 2 – Henry Bugalho, YouTuber, writer, translator and philosopher

Deaths
March 22 – Hélio Oiticica, artist (born 1937)
July 9 – Vinicius de Moraes, poet and dramatist (born 1913)
December 21 – Nelson Rodrigues, journalist, novelist and playwright (born 1912)

See also 
1980 in Brazilian football
1980 in Brazilian television
List of Brazilian films of 1980

References

 
1980s in Brazil
Years of the 20th century in Brazil
Brazil
Brazil